JK Sillamäe Kalev U21 is a football club based in Sillamäe, Estonia. It is Sillamäe Kalev's reserve team. They play their home games at Sillamäe Kalev Stadium. Reserve teams in Estonia play in the same league system as their senior teams rather than a separate league. Reserve teams, however, cannot play in the same division as their senior team. Players can switch between senior and reserve teams.

History

Players

Current squad
 ''As of 15 June 2017.

Players out on loan

References

External links
Official website

Sillamae Kalev II
Estonian reserve football teams
2011 establishments in Estonia
Association football clubs established in 2011